George Parr (22 May 1826 – 23 June 1891) was an English cricketer whose first-class career lasted from 1844 to 1870. Known popularly as the "Lion of the North", Parr was a right-handed batsman and bowled occasional right-handed underarm deliveries. Throughout his career he played mainly for Nottinghamshire, and was club captain from 1856 to 1870. He also made occasional appearances for other counties and for Marylebone Cricket Club. He was a stalwart of the All-England Eleven and was captain of the first England touring team, which went to North America in 1859. He also captained England's second tour to Australia and New Zealand in 1864, returning home unbeaten. During this trip he travelled with the team from Liverpool to Melbourne on the SS Great Britain.

Parr played in 207 first-class matches and had 358 innings, in 30 of which he was not out. Parr is widely considered as the best cricket player in the world in his time. He scored 6,626 runs (average 20.20) at a time when conditions greatly favoured bowlers. His highest score was 130 for Nottinghamshire, against Surrey at The Oval on 14 July 1859; his only century. He made 31 fifties and took 126 catches. He took 29 wickets in his career with a best analysis of 6/42. The Parr Stand which was replaced at Trent Bridge was named in his honour.

References
Notes

Sources
 H S Altham, A History of Cricket, Volume 1 (to 1914), George Allen & Unwin, 1926
 Derek Birley, A Social History of English Cricket, Aurum, 1999
 Rowland Bowen, Cricket: A History of its Growth and Development, Eyre & Spottiswoode, 1970
 Arthur Haygarth, Scores & Biographies, Volumes 3–9 (1841–1866), Lillywhite, 1862–1867
 John Major, More Than A Game, HarperCollins, 2007 – includes the famous 1859 touring team photo taken on board ship at Liverpool
 Chris Harte, A History of Australian Cricket, Andre Deutsch, 1993

External links

 

1826 births
1891 deaths
All-England Eleven cricketers
Parr, George
Marylebone Cricket Club cricketers
Nottinghamshire cricketers
Surrey cricketers
Sussex cricketers
Kent cricketers
North v South cricketers
Players cricketers
People from Radcliffe-on-Trent
Cricketers from Nottinghamshire
Nottinghamshire cricket captains
Nottingham Cricket Club cricketers
Players of Nottinghamshire cricketers
Gentlemen of Southwell cricketers
Fast v Slow cricketers
Nicholas Felix's XI cricketers
Over 36 v Under 36 cricketers
Married v Single cricketers